USS Lark may refer to:

 , a  laid down 11 March 1918 by Baltimore Dry Dock & Shipbuilding Co., Baltimore, Maryland
 , a  laid down 5 January 1943 as YMS-376 by Greenport Basin and Construction Co., Greenport, Long Island, New York

United States Navy ship names